Phalium glaucum, common name the grey bonnet or glaucus bonnet, is a species of large sea snail, a marine gastropod mollusk in the family Cassidae, the helmet snails and bonnet snails.

Distribution
This species is widespread in the Indo-Pacific, from Eastern Africa (Madagascar, Mozambique, Tanzania) to Southern Japan and Melanesia.

Habitat
This species lives on sandy bottoms with seagrass meadows, in intertidal and shallow subtidal areas to a depth of about 10 m.

Description

These shells are helmet shaped with a large body whorl and tiny spires. The surface of shell is smooth and uniformly greyish or pale brown. The molluscs have a white body and a large yellowish or whitish foot which is edged in reddish brown. The operculum is bright yellow and fan-shaped. Usually this sea snail buries itself in the sandy areas with the long siphon sticking out.

Bibliography
 Arianna Fulvo and Roberto Nistri (2005). 350 coquillages du monde entier. Delachaux et Niestlé (Paris) : 256 p.
 Tan S.K., Ng H.E. & Nguang L.H.S. (2013) A new species of Phalium Link, 1807 (Gastropoda: Tonnoidea: Cassidae) from the Sunda Shelf. The Raffles Bulletin of Zoology 61(2): 507-514

References

 Dautzenberg P. (1929). Contribution à l'étude de la faune de Madagascar: Mollusca marina testacea. Faune des colonies françaises, 3(4): 321-636, pls 4-7. Société d'Editions géographiques, maritimes et coloniales, Paris. (
 Orr J. (1985). Hong Kong seashells. The Urban Council, Hong Kong
 Verbinnen G., Segers L., Swinnen F., Kreipl K. & Monsecour D. (2016). Cassidae. An amazing family of seashells. Harxheim: ConchBooks. 251 pp
 Steyn, D.G & Lussi, M. (2005). Offshore Shells of Southern Africa: A pictorial guide to more than 750 Gastropods. Published by the authors. Pp. i–vi, 1–289.
  Drivas, J. & Jay, M. (1987). Coquillages de La Réunion et de l'Île Maurice. Collection Les Beautés de la Nature. Delachaux et Niestlé: Neuchâtel. ISBN 2-603-00654-1. 159 pp. 
 Steyn, D.G. & Lussi, M. (1998) Marine Shells of South Africa. An Illustrated Collector's Guide to Beached Shells. Ekogilde Publishers, Hartebeespoort, South Africa, ii + 264 pp.
 Liu, J.Y. [Ruiyu] (ed.). (2008). Checklist of marine biota of China seas. China Science Press. 1267 pp

External links
 Linnaeus, C. (1758). Systema Naturae per regna tria naturae, secundum classes, ordines, genera, species, cum characteribus, differentiis, synonymis, locis. Editio decima, reformata
 Schumacher, C. F. (1817). Essai d'un nouveau système des habitations des vers testacés. Schultz, Copenghagen. iv + 288 pp., 22 pls. 
  Tan S.K., Ng H.E. & Nguang L.H.S. (2013) A new species of Phalium Link, 1807 (Gastropoda: Tonnoidea: Cassidae) from the Sunda Shelf. The Raffles Bulletin of Zoology 61(2): 507-514.
 Barnard, K. H. (1963). Contributions to the knowledge of South African marine Mollusca. Part III. Gastropoda: Prosobranchiata: Taenioglossa. i>Annals of the South African Museum 47(1): 1-199

Cassidae
Gastropods described in 1758
Taxa named by Carl Linnaeus